Elis Meetua is an Estonian football goalkeeper currently playing in the Meistriliiga for Pärnu JK, with whom she has also played the Champions League. She was a member of the Estonian national team 1995–2011.

References

External links

1979 births
Living people
Estonian women's footballers
Estonia women's international footballers
Women's association football goalkeepers
Pärnu JK players